Boyd Woodcock is a former professional Australian rules footballer who played for Port Adelaide in the Australian Football League (AFL).

Woodcock played in 's SANFL premiership side in 2018 kicking 3 goals and having 17 disposals at 18 years old.

However, he kicked his debut goal the following round against  at Adelaide Oval. Woodcock was delisted at the end of the 2021 season.

References 
www.AFL.com.au

External links

2000 births
Living people
Port Adelaide Football Club players
Port Adelaide Football Club players (all competitions)
Australian rules footballers from South Australia
North Adelaide Football Club players